Rochert is an unincorporated community in Becker County, Minnesota, United States. Rochert has a post office with ZIP code 56578. The settlement was founded by Palm Peter and by Heuters Nikolaus from Rocherath, Belgium.

References

Unincorporated communities in Becker County, Minnesota
Unincorporated communities in Minnesota